The News & Citizen is a weekly newspaper with a circulation of 13,500 based in Morrisville in the U.S. state of Vermont. It covers Lamoille County — the towns and villages of Morristown and Morrisville, Cambridge, Jeffersonville, Belvidere, Waterville, Johnson, Eden, Elmore, Hyde Park and Wolcott, plus Greensboro, Craftsbury and Hardwick, Vermont.

Early history 
In 1881 the News and Citizen was created when the Vermont Citizen (Morrisville, 1873 - 1881) and the Lamoille News (Hyde Park, 1877-1881) were combined. L. Halsey Lewis (publisher until 1922) and Henry C. Fisk were responsible for the consolidation.

Arthur A. Twiss became owner, editor and manager of the News and Citizen (and the Lamoille Publishing Company) and  after Lewis’ retirement in 1922.

Prior to this merge the Lamoille News had been created in 1877 by Orville S. Basford when the Lamoille Newsdealer's owner died and the subscriber list was purchased by the Vermont Citizen. Thus ensued a three year competition between the two papers until they decided to consolidate in 1881.

In 1942 Arthur B. Limoge purchased the News & Citizen. Clyde Limoge (Arthur’s son) became publisher in 1958, followed by Arthur’s grandson Bradley in 1973.

Recent history 
On Oct. 1, 2015, the Stowe Reporter LLC bought the two Morrisville-based publications on Oct. 1 from Bradley Limoge. A full-color, tabloid-sized News & Citizen launched in January 2016. The revamped newspaper was a merger of the current broadsheet-format News & Citizen and the free weekly, The Transcript.

Mickey Smith was editor of the paper from July 2015 until his death in early 2016. He had served as a reporter for 20+ years at the News and Citizen prior to his promotion. After Smith’s death Tom Kearney became the editor of the paper. In 2017, Hannah Marshall Normandeau became managing editor of the News & Citizen, Stowe Reporter and Waterbury Record. Kearney returned as editor in November 2019.

In January 2019, the company changed its name to the Vermont Community Newspaper Group. The company now publishes five weekly newspapers in two regions of Vermont — the Stowe Reporter and the News & Citizen of Morrisville, communities that line up along Route 100 in north-central Vermont, and the South Burlington The Other Paper, the Shelburne News and The Citizen of Charlotte and Hinesburg, covering communities near Burlington.

Awards and recognition

Vermont Press Association

References

External links 
 Official website

Newspapers published in Vermont
Weekly newspapers published in the United States
1881 establishments in Vermont
Publications established in 1881